Hakimov is a surname. Notable people with the surname include:

 Mansur Hakimov (born 1977), Tajikistani footballer
 Numonjon Hakimov (born 1978), Tajikistani footballer
 Rahim Hakimov (born 1983) Uzbek legal scholar and politician

See also
 Khakimov, surname